Michael Eineder is an electrical engineer at the Technische Universität München (TUM), Germany. He was named a Fellow of the Institute of Electrical and Electronics Engineers (IEEE) in 2016 for his contributions to synthetic aperture radar image processing for geodesy.

References 

Fellow Members of the IEEE
Living people
Year of birth missing (living people)
Place of birth missing (living people)